Shivam Sharma (born 14 November 1995) is an Indian cricketer. He made his List A debut on 20 February 2021, for Uttar Pradesh in the 2020–21 Vijay Hazare Trophy. He made his Twenty20 debut on 4 November 2021, for Uttar Pradesh in the 2021–22 Syed Mushtaq Ali Trophy.

References

External links
 

1995 births
Living people
Indian cricketers
Uttar Pradesh cricketers
Place of birth missing (living people)